Robert Walter Dews (March 23, 1939 – December 26, 2015) was an American infielder in minor league baseball and a coach in Major League Baseball.

Born in the small town of Clinton, Iowa, Bobby Dews moved to rural Edison, Georgia, to live with his grandparents at an early age and graduated from Edison High School (now Calhoun County High School).

Dews played baseball and basketball for the Georgia Tech Yellow Jackets before being drafted by the St. Louis Cardinals. He then followed in the footsteps of his stepmother and other family members by obtaining his associate degree in 1963 from Andrew College in Cuthbert, Georgia, and later graduated with a bachelor's degree from West Georgia College.

Dews played and managed in the Cardinals' farm system before joining the Atlanta Braves organization in 1974. The  season marked Dews' 35th consecutive season with the Braves, including 14 years spent as a coach on the major league level. His career as an Atlanta coach occurred during three different terms (1979–81; 1985; 1997–2006). After the  season, he retired as the Braves' bullpen coach to become a roving coach. In addition, he worked with the Braves at home games and for the minor league teams when the major league club was on the road.

In an article published in the Atlanta magazine printed in March 2003 (Vol. 42, No. 12, Page 60), Dews references his writings from as far back as 35 years prior.  Of particular note is his book Legends Demons and Dreams, originally released in hardcover by Longstreet Press in 2005 and published in paperback in 2007 by Literati Press.

In 2008, Dews became a writer-in-residence at Andrew College in Cuthbert, Georgia, where he attended college for a short time. While a writer-in-residence at Andrew, Dews completed and published a second collection of stories entitled An Illusion of Victory, which were released by CreateSpace in 2009.

Dews died on December 26, 2015, in Albany, Georgia at the age of 76. The Braves wore a patch in his memory for the 2016 season, a white rectangle with a black outline and his nickname "Dewsy" in black, on the right sleeve.

Sources

External links

Retrosheet

1939 births
2015 deaths
20th-century American writers
21st-century American writers
20th-century American male writers
American men's basketball players
Arkansas Travelers players
Atlanta Braves coaches
Baseball players from Iowa
Billings Mustangs players
Daytona Beach Islanders players
Durham Bulls managers
Georgia Tech Yellow Jackets baseball players
Georgia Tech Yellow Jackets men's basketball players
Jacksonville Suns players
Lancaster Red Roses players
Major League Baseball bullpen coaches
People from Calhoun County, Georgia
People from Clinton, Iowa
People from Cuthbert, Georgia
Portsmouth-Norfolk Tides players
St. Petersburg Cardinals players
Tulsa Oilers (baseball) players
Winnipeg Goldeyes players
Writers from Georgia (U.S. state)